Steffanie Rhiannon Newell (born 15 November 1994) is a Welsh professional wrestler. She is signed to WWE where she performs on the SmackDown brand under the ring name Tegan Nox. Newell previously wrestled on the British independent circuit under the ring name Nixon Newell, most notably for promotions such as Attack! Pro Wrestling, Progress Wrestling, WhatCulture Pro Wrestling, and Fight Club: Pro.

Early life 
Steffanie Newell was born on 15 November 1994 in Bargoed, Wales, 15 miles north of Cardiff. As a little girl, Newell played football for a number of teams in her area. At one point she took part in trials for both Cardiff City and the Wales national team. At age 13, she suffered a knee injury which would ultimately cost her a place on the Wales Under-16 team. When she finally turned 16, she gave up football, instead planning on taking a long hiatus from all sports, citing her knee injury and a lack of passion for the sport as her reasons.

Shortly after quitting football, she found a professional wrestling school in Port Talbot and began training under Dave Stewart and "Wild Boar" Mike Hitchman. She said that the encouragement of her late grandfather to pursue a career in professional wrestling was her main inspiration. Outside of football, she played netball and tag rugby. Despite playing football for the majority of her youth, Newell grew up as a fan of professional wrestling after being introduced to it at the age of five and cites Molly Holly as her favourite female wrestler and dream opponent.

Professional wrestling career

Total Nonstop Action Wrestling (2013) 
Newell made a one-time appearance on Total Nonstop Action (TNA) Wrestling at their pay-per-view event Slammiversary XI as a fan under her real name. She won an all expenses paid trip via Challenge TV. Newell was interviewed by SoCal Val.

Attack! Pro Wrestling (2013–2017) 
Newell debuted for Attack! Pro Wrestling in July 2014, competing three times on the same show. Firstly, she defeated Lana Austin and later in the evening teamed with Austin to defeat Mark Andrews and Pete Dunne to win the Attack! 24/7 Championship for the second time in her career. Later that night, Newell and Austin lost the championship to Mike Bird in a handicap match.

Newell debuted her Luchadora The Explorer character on 24 January 2015, teaming with Brookes in a loss to The Anti-Fun Police (Damian Dunne and Ryan Smile). She competed as Luchadora once again on 14 February, winning a special invitational scramble match. In January 2016, Newell aligned herself with Mark Andrews, forming the extremely popular team known as Bayside High. In their first match as a team, Newell and Andrews defeated #CCK (Brookes and Kid Lykos). Two days later on 3 April, Bayside High became the new Attack: Pro! Tag Team Champions, defeating #CCK. The duo retained the titles until August, when they lost them back to #CCK in a TLC match.

In late 2016, Newell turned into a villainess, abandoning Bayside High and aligning herself with Pete Dunne. In their first match together, Dunne and Newell (dressed as the Suicide Squad iterations of The Joker and Harley Quinn, respectively) defeated Martin Kirby and El Ligero (dressed as Kevin Owens and El Generico, respectively).

Fight Club: Pro (2015–2017) 
Nixon Newell was the first woman to wrestle at Wolverhampton based promotion, Fight Club: Pro in 2015 where she competed in a 4-way match in the infinity tournament against Chris Brookes, Dan Moloney and Eddie Dennis.

Due to Newell's departure to WWE, Fight Club: Pro honored her with a show named after her “First Female of Fight Club” where Nixon requested to face Candice LeRae. This match ended after Newell hit LeRae with the Shiniest Wizard.

Newell's final FCP match took place at Dream Tag Team Invitational (Night 1) where she was a surprise entrant in a 6-way match.

Progress Wrestling (2016) 
Newell debuted for Progress Wrestling on 28 August 2016, defeating Alex Windsor. On 27 November, she entered the Natural Progression Series IV Tournament (a single elimination tournament to crown the first ever Progress Women's Champion), defeating Katey Harvey in the first round.

Shimmer Women Athletes (2016) 
Newell debuted for the American all-female promotion Shimmer Women Athletes at Volume 81, first losing to Veda Scott and then losing to Nicole Matthews the following day at Volume 82. At Volume 84, Newell picked up her first win in Shimmer, defeating Scott.

What Culture Pro Wrestling (2016–2017) 
Newell debuted for What Culture Pro Wrestling (WCPW) on 27 July at Loaded #5, defeating Bea Priestley, but was defeated by Priestley the following day. On 24 August, Newell and Priestley faced off once again, this time in a last woman standing match to crown the first ever WCPW Women's Champion, won by Newell. On 13 February 2017, Newell lost the WCPW Women's Championship to Bea Priestley in a no disqualification match, ending her reign at 173 days.

World Wonder Ring Stardom (2017) 
In January 2017, Newell embarked on her first tour of Japan, competing with the all-female promotion Stardom. In her first match on the tour, she and Kay Lee Ray defeated Oedo Tai (Kris Wolf and Viper). On 29 January, Newell challenged Kairi Hojo for the Wonder of Stardom Championship, losing after a diving elbow from Hojo.

WWE

Mae Young Classic (2017–2018) 
In April 2017, it was reported that Newell had signed a contract with WWE. It was reported that Newell was replaced in the WWE Mae Young Classic, because of tearing to her ACL before the tournament had even began. Newell returned to the ring on 13 April 2018, at an NXT live event, where she teamed up with Dakota Kai in a tag team match to defeat Reina González and Vanessa Borne. After being announced as a competitor in the 2018 Mae Young Classic, Newell entered the tournament on 8 August, under the ring name Tegan Nox, defeating Zatara. Nox returned the following day, defeating Nicole Matthews in the second round before suffering another knee injury in her quarter-final match against Rhea Ripley. After the match premiered on the WWE Network, Nox posted on Twitter that she had suffered numerous injuries during the match, including: a torn ACL, MCL, lateral collateral ligament, meniscus, and patellar dislocation.

NXT (2019–2021) 
On 25 June 2019, Nox made her in-ring return at an NXT live event in Orlando, Florida. On 11 September, Nox made her NXT UK debut when she defeated Shax. Afterwards, Nox began a feud with NXT UK Women's Champion Kay Lee Ray, resulting in a non-title match between the two on 3 October episode of NXT UK, where Nox was unsuccessful. On 16 October, Nox returned to NXT, defeating Taynara. Thereafter, Nox began teaming with long-time friend Dakota Kai, with the two defeating Jessamyn Duke and Marina Shafir to become number one contenders to the WWE Women's Tag Team Championship on 23 October episode of NXT. Nox and Kai would go on to lose their title match against The Kabuki Warriors (Asuka and Kairi Sane) on 30 October episode of NXT. Two days later on SmackDown, Nox and Ripley were one of the many NXT wrestlers to invade the show, challenging Mandy Rose and Sonya Deville to a tag-team match, which Nox and Ripley emerged victorious. Later that night, Nox joined Triple H and the rest of the NXT roster as they declared war on both Raw and SmackDown, and vowed to win the Survivor Series brand warfare. Nox was chosen by Ripley to join her team as part of a women's WarGames match at NXT TakeOver: WarGames. At the event on 23 November, just before the match took place, Mia Yim was attacked backstage and unable to compete in the women's WarGames match, before her teammate Dakota Kai replaced Yim on Team Ripley. Ripley's team defeated Shayna Baszler's team, however Nox would not take part in the match after Kai turned on Team Ripley and attacked her.

After a short hiatus due to a storyline injury, Nox returned on 15 January 2020 episode of NXT, competing in a number one contendership battle royal for the NXT Women's Championship, where she was unsuccessful after Kai interfered and eliminated her. On 29 January episode of NXT, Nox defeated Kai after using a knee brace following interference by Candice LeRae. On 16 February at NXT TakeOver: Portland, Nox lost to Kai in a street fight match after interference by the debuting Raquel González, formerly known as Reina González. On 4 March episode of NXT, Nox lost to Kai again in a steel cage match, after González interfered. On 7 June at TakeOver: In Your House, Nox teamed up with Mia Yim and Shotzi Blackheart to defeat Kai, González and Candice LeRae in a six-woman tag team match. On 1 July episode of NXT The Great American Bash, Nox defeated Kai, LeRae and Yim in a fatal four-way elimination match to become the number one contender for the NXT Women's Championship. On 15 July episode of NXT, Nox was unsuccessful in her title match against defending champion Io Shirai. On 23 September episode of NXT, LeRae viciously attacked her with a steel pipe and LeRae ran a crate into her surgically repaired left knee, diasbling her to compete in a NXT Women's Championship #1 Contender's Battle Royal match. On 30 September, WWE announced that Nox had once again suffered a torn ACL and would be out of action for an indefinite amount of time.

After a near ten-month absence, Nox returned on 6 July 2021 at The Great American Bash, causing LeRae and Indi Hartwell to lose the NXT Women's Tag Team Championship to Io Shirai and Zoey Stark. After the match, Nox attacked LeRae.

Main roster (2021, 2022–present) 
On 9 July episode of SmackDown, Nox made her main roster debut teaming with Shotzi as Shotzi & Nox to defeat the WWE Women's Tag Team Champions, Natalya and Tamina in a non-title match. The two would then go on to defeat Natalya and Tamina in numerous tag team matches, but would never receive a championship match. As part of the 2021 Draft, Nox was drafted to the Raw brand while Shotzi remained on the SmackDown brand, thus ending the team. On 18 November, she was released from her WWE contract without ever appearing on Raw.

After a year, Newell returned to the WWE on 2 December 2022 episode of SmackDown, reprising her Tegan Nox character after rescuing Liv Morgan from an attack by Damage CTRL (Bayley and the WWE Women's Tag Team Champions Dakota Kai and Iyo Sky).

The following week on 9 December 2022 episode of SmackDown, Tegan Nox and Liv Morgan defeated Ronda Rousey and Shayna Baszler in a tag team match, earning them a shot at the WWE Women's Tag Team Championship. On 16 December 2022 episode of SmackDown, Nox and Morgan lost to Damage CTRL due to the interference of a masked stagehand later revealed on WWE's social media channels as Xia Li.

Professional wrestling style and persona 
Newell has stated her ring name "Tegan Nox" is a tribute to both her Welsh heritage and being a fan of the Harry Potter franchise. This also relates to her nickname: "The Girl with the Shiniest Wizard" – as she uses a step-up knee strike, commonly referred to as a shining wizard, as her finishing move. She has dubbed herself NXT's resident "Lady Kane"; a moniker that she gave herself in honor of her favorite WWE Superstar, Kane, as well as adopting his chokeslam finisher.

Other media 
Newell made her video game debut as a playable character in WWE 2K22.

Personal life 
Talking on WWE's online show The Bump, Newell confirmed she is bisexual. Newell said, "For me, it's always been, like, not about gender. If someone makes me laugh and they make me feel good and they're nice people, I'm all for that. It doesn't matter if they're man, woman, it doesn't matter to me."

Championships and accomplishments 
 Attack! Pro Wrestling
 Attack! 24/7 Championship (3 times) − by herself (2 times), with Lana Austin (1 time)
 Attack! Tag Team Championship (1 time) – with Mark Andrews
 British Empire Wrestling
 British Empire Women's Championship (1 time)
 DDT Pro-Wrestling
 Ironman Heavymetalweight Championship (2 times)
 Pro Wrestling Illustrated
 Ranked No. 26 of the top 100 female wrestlers in the PWI Women's 100 in 2020
 Southside Wrestling Entertainment
 SWE Tag Team Championship (1 time) − with PJ Black
 Queen of Southside Championship (1 time)
 What Culture Pro Wrestling
 WCPW Women's Championship (1 time)

References

External links 

 
 
 

1994 births
Bisexual sportspeople
Bisexual women
Expatriate professional wrestlers
LGBT professional wrestlers
Welsh LGBT sportspeople
Welsh bisexual people
Living people
People from Bargoed
Sportspeople from Caerphilly County Borough
Welsh female professional wrestlers
21st-century professional wrestlers
Ironman Heavymetalweight Champions